Bwakira may refer to:
 Nicholas Bwakira, a Burundian diplomat
 Bwakira, Rwanda, a town in Western Province, Rwanda